Lusinga Airport  is an airport serving the village of Lusinga in Haut-Katanga Province, Democratic Republic of the Congo.

See also

Transport in the Democratic Republic of the Congo
List of airports in the Democratic Republic of the Congo

References

External links
 FallingRain - Lusinga Airport
 HERE Maps - Lusinga
 OpenStreetMap - Lusinga
 OurAirports - Lusinga
 

Airports in Haut-Katanga Province